Christoph Ploß (born 19 July 1985) is a German politician of the Christian Democratic Union (CDU) who has been serving as a member of the Bundestag from the state of Hamburg since 2017.

Early life 
Ploß completed his abitur at the Gelehrtenschule des Johanneums in 2005. From 2015 until 2017, he worked in media relations at Bauer Media Group.

Political career 
Ploß became a member of the Bundestag after the 2017 German federal election. He is a member of the Committee on European Affairs and the Committee on Transport and Digital Infrastructure.

In addition to his committee assignments, Ploß has been chairing the German Parliamentary Friendship Group for Relations with Arabic-Speaking States in the Middle East since 2022.

In 2020, Roland Heintze proposed Ploß as candidate to succeed him as chairman of the CDU in Hamburg; at a party convention, Ploß was subsequently elected by a majority of 86 percent. Ahead of the 2021 elections, Ploß was elected to lead the CDU campaign in Hamburg.

Political positions 
In 2020, Ploß opposed plans to introduce a mandatory women quota within the CDU's regional and national governing bodies by 2025.

Ahead of the Christian Democrats' leadership election, Ploß publicly endorsed in 2020 Friedrich Merz to succeed Annegret Kramp-Karrenbauer as the party's chair.

References

External links 

  
 Bundestag biography 

1985 births
Living people
Members of the Bundestag for Hamburg
Members of the Bundestag 2017–2021
Members of the Bundestag 2021–2025
Members of the Bundestag for the Christian Democratic Union of Germany
People educated at the Gelehrtenschule des Johanneums